Noel Kelly may refer to:

Noel Kelly (footballer) (1921–1991), Irish association football player
Noel Francis Kelly (1930–1991)), Australian horse trainer
Noel Kelly (rugby league) (1936–2020), Australian rugby league Hall of Famer
Noel Kelly, musician in The Hush Now